Orinella pulchella is a species of small sea snail, a marine gastropod mollusk in the family Pyramidellidae, the pyrams and their allies.

Description
The shell has a polished  appearance. It is yellowish white, with a sutural chocolate band, appearing on the periphery of the body whorl. The columella has two plications.

Distribution
This marine species occurs in the Red Sea and off Japan, Korea and the Philippines.

References

External links
 To World Register of Marine Species
 
  Ronald G. Noseworthy, Na-Rae Lim, and Kwang-Sik Choi, A Catalogue of the Mollusks of Jeju Island, South Korea; Korean Journal of Malacology, Vol. 23(1): 65-104, June 30, 2007

Pyramidellidae
Gastropods described in 1854